Demetrius/Dimetrius "Dimmy" Frank/Franks (first ¼ 1876 – second ¼ 1954) was a Welsh rugby union, and professional rugby league footballer who played in the 1890s and 1900s.

Background
Dimmy Franks' birth was registered in Cardiff, Wales, he was the landlord of the Fleece Inn public house, Kingston upon Hull  and the Myton Arms public house, Kingston upon Hull , as of November 1950 he was living in Cardiff, Wales., and his death aged  was registered in East Glamorgan, Wales.

Background
Dimmy Franks' marriage was registered during fourth ¼ 1904 in Hull, England

References

External links
Search for "Franks" at rugbyleagueproject.org
(archived by web.archive.org) Stats → Past Players → "F"
(archived by web.archive.org) Statistics at hullfc.com
Search for "Dimmy Franks" at britishnewspaperarchive.co.uk
Search for "Demetrius Frank" at britishnewspaperarchive.co.uk
Search for "Demetrius Franks" at britishnewspaperarchive.co.uk

1876 births
1954 deaths
British publicans
Cardiff RFC players
Hull F.C. players
Place of death missing
Rugby league five-eighths
Rugby league halfbacks
Rugby league players from Cardiff
Rugby union players from Cardiff
Welsh rugby league players
Welsh rugby union players